Falsity refers to multiple concepts:
 Untruth, meaning absence of truth, meaning accuracy.
 Deception (TBD: double check accuracy of this statement)